Treasure Fever! ( La Fievre du Tresor) is the first book of the Schooling Around series by Andy Griffiths. It was published in April 2008 by Pan Macmillan Australia.

Plot
Henry McThrottle waits with his friends Jack, a drawer; pan phobic Newton, muscular Gretel and sociable Jenny for their teacher Mrs. Chalkboard to come. Mr. Greenbeard, the school principal and naval buff comes to the class to announce the new substitute teacher Mr. Brainfright who will replace Mrs. Chalkboard while she is on a spot of "shore leave". It becomes immediately apparent that Mr. Brainfright doesn't know a thing about teaching, and proceeds to make his first lesson about how to breathe. This results in him falling out the window, to where the whole class successfully pulls him back in, and where Mrs. Cross is introduced.

Mr. Brainfright continues to tell the class about a riddle where a man has a goat, a wolf, and some cabbage, and he needs to cross a river, with the reward being a lollipop. Henry correctly answers the riddle using spitballs thrown to him by Clive Durkin, the class bully. At recess, Clive and his brother Fred claim that the lollipop is his because Henry used Clive's spitballs to help him work it out. Fred and Henry then fight until Mrs. Cross stops it and sends Henry to the office.

Henry explains the problem to Mr. Greenbeard, who understands as a similar thing happened to him when he was younger. Mr. Greenbeard had a treasure chest full of things that he had, buried in a hill that he named "Skull Island", which had been stolen. Mr. Greenbeard recited the poem that was left in the chest, which inspires Henry to look for it. He enlists his friends Jack, Newton, Gretel, and Jenny to help him.

The next day, Mr. Brainfright attempts to engage the class in history by mentioning how everyone's making history as they live. They stage a “reenactment” of yesterday's breathing lesson incident, where this time Mr. Brainfright ends up falling out the window, much to Mrs. Cross’s annoyance. Henry and his friends try to look for the treasure during lunch, but they failed. Henry correctly deduces that the book “One Thousand Nights and a Night” might contain clues for the treasure's location, since the book was referenced in the poem. Going to the library, Jenny also correctly inferred another line referencing “The Ruined Man Who Became Rich Again Through a Dream” which means that Greenbeard's treasure is still buried at Skull Island, the hill on school property.

Henry enlists Grant Gadget, an inventor, to lend him a metal detector to find a metal key to the chest. The next day, Jenny accidentally leaked to Fiona that they were finding treasure, which sets up a treasure hunting craze and pushes Henry and his friends off Skull Island. Fred and Clive encounter them, to which Henry admits the treasure exists but proceeds to give them a fake map the next day, deliberately falsifying the location as well to successfully lure everyone off Skull Island.

Mr. Brainfright divulges his most unusual lesson yet: how to be friends with a banana. This leads to them skidding on banana peels, which leads to Mr. Brainfright accidentally bumping Mrs. Cross out the window. She reports to Mr. Greenbeard and he makes Mr. Brainfright behave and co-operate. Mr. Brainfright begins normal instruction by giving the class a spelling test. Here he reveals he was formerly an archeologist, much to Henry's delight when he asks for help finding the treasure.

Mr. Brainfright conducts an archaeological dig with the whole class, and they finally find the treasure. Mrs. Cross declares this the last straw and drags Mr. Brainfright to the office to get fired, but not before they free the treasure with his jackhammer. Henry is dismayed that Mr. Brainfright will be fired but decides to use the treasure to convince Mr. Greenbeard to change his mind. They get the treasure out, but Fred steals it and opens it up with the key. All that is found is marble, a rock, a pencil, a yo-yo, a shark's tooth, a rabbit's foot, a black-eye patch, a plastic ring, a water pistol, and a football card. Fred gets angry with Henry when he saw what was inside, and attempts to attack him. Instead, he trips over Newton's foot and falls into the hole where the treasure was found, giving time to grab it and race to Greenbeard's office.

Greenbeard gets so happy that his items were found and discovers the identity of the initials W.S. engraved in the chest as Wendy Smith, now Mrs. Cross. She reveals she was jealous that she wasn't allowed to play with Mr. Greenbeard pirates and stole the treasure out of retaliation. Mr. Greenbeard forgives her and gives Mr. Brainfight his job back.

Henry and his friends take one item each from the box as a reward, with Henry picking up a pencil with a skull on it.

Meanwhile, even Fiona admires Mr. Brainfright's eccentricities, and he teaches the whole class how to fly.

Reception

References

2008 Australian novels
Pan Books books
Australian children's novels
2008 children's books
Novels set in schools
Novels by Andy Griffiths